Huanxi may refer to:

 Huanxi, Fuzhou (宦溪镇), town in Jin'an District, Fuzhou, Fujian, People's Republic of China (PRC)
 Huanxi, Chaling County (浣溪镇), town in Hunan, PRC